Yoshiaki Wada (10 October 1971) is a Japanese politician, since 2016 member of the House of Representatives from Hokkaido 5th district. He is a member of the Liberal Democratic Party.

References

Liberal Democratic Party (Japan) politicians

1971 births

Living people
Place of birth missing (living people)